Manuelle is both a given name and a surname. Notable people with the name include:

 Manuelle Daumas (born 1983), French singer-songwriter and performer
 Manuelle Gautrand (born 1961), French architect
 Víctor Manuelle (born 1968), Puerto Rican salsa singer and songwriter

See also
 Manuell